Waltair Veerayya is a 2023 Indian Telugu-language action comedy film directed by Bobby Kolli and produced by Mythri Movie Makers. The film stars Chiranjeevi as the title character alongside Ravi Teja, Shruti Haasan, and Catherine Tresa.

The film was announced in August 2021, principal photography commenced in December 2021 with filming taking place in Hyderabad, Visakhapatnam and Malaysia. The soundtrack is composed by Devi Sri Prasad with cinematography by Arthur A. Wilson. Waltair Veerayya was released on 13 January 2023, and received mixed reviews from critics. The film was successful at the box office becoming the highest grossing Telugu film of 2023.

Plot 

Waltair Veerayya, a notorious fisherman-cum-smuggler from Vizag, needs money to fight a court case. He is approached by CI Seethapathi, who tells him about Solomon Caesar, a notorious drug lord who escaped from RAW's custody after killing multiple police officers. Seethapathi, who was responsible for Caesor's custody, gets suspended from service. He asks Veerayya to extradite Caesar from Malaysia to India, in exchange for providing money. Veerayya accepts the deal and travels to Malaysia with his friends and Seethapathi's brother-in-law. They check in at a hotel owned by Caesar and devise a plot to kidnap him.

However, Veerayya misses the opportunity as he gets stunned by seeing Dr Nithya and her daughter, Vaishnavi, where Nithya angrily takes the kid away from Veerayya. Seethapathi's brother-in-law gets impatient and prompts Seethapathi to follow Caesar on their own without Veerayya's knowledge, only to get caught by Caesar. Veerayya arrives at the place and tricks Caesar into believing that they want to cut a drug deal with him, therefore saving the day. Later, Veerayya gets invited by Caesar to his private party where a group of masked assassins attempt to nab Caesar, but their plans are foiled by Veerayya, who later realises that they are the hotel staff.

They reveal themselves as RAW agents, led by Athidhi. Caesar expresses his admiration for Veerayya and offers to ask him anything in return for saving his life. Veerayya asks him to come back to India and Caesar agrees, but soon finds out about their ploy and they get busted. As Caesar assaults Athithi for information with his elder brother Michael Solomon on video conference, Veerayya retaliates and reveals that Michael was his ultimate target. Veerayya kills Caeser at the public fair in the Batu Caves, where a helpless Michael witnesses everything.

Past: Four years ago, Michael, in disguise as a fisherman named Kaala, acts as Veerayya's friend and confidant. Without Veerayya's knowledge, Michael supplies drugs from the former's ice factory. The newly appointed ACP Vikram Sagar, who is also Veerayya's half-brother, arrives in Vizag and begins a crackdown on the drug syndicate. During their childhood, Veerayya, who suffered from vertigo, accidentally let Sagar fall from a tree. Ever since, the brothers grew up separately. Though Sagar developed hatred towards Veerayya, Veerayya always loved him. Sagar is also happily married to Dr. Nithya and they bear a daughter Vaishnavi.

Sagar tracks down the origin of drugs in Veerayya's locality, but Michael manages to keep his cover. One day, the ice factory accidentally supplies cocaine, wrapped in ice to a school, which resulted in the deaths of 25 children. Michael subsequently frames Veerayya and plans to escape to Malaysia. Veerayya gets arrested by the police, who decides to kill him in an encounter to calm the public rage. Sagar, who believes that Veerayya is innocent, loots the seized drugs to lure Michael. He secretly arrives at the planned encounter shooting, in place of Veerayya to nab Michael.

However, the JCP, who is also Sagar's senior officer, is in cahoots with Michael, where he fatally stabs him, along with Michael's men. Michael manages to escape as Veerayya arrives, not before he shows his true face to him. Veerayya tries to take a heavily injured Sagar to the hospital, but he succumbed to his injuries on the way, revealing that he always had affection for him, but could not express it publicly due to his crackdown on the drug syndicate. Veerayya is stopped by the police and taken away. Sagar is deprived of state honours and labelled as a traitor by the police. Heartbroken, Veerayya decides on extraditing Michael to India for his testimony in court, before Seethapati shows him the way.

Present: Veerayya sets up Michael against his drug partner by blowing up his base of operations. The rival gang attempts to kill Michael, where he agrees to come to India with Veerayya and testify in court, in exchange for his life. With the help of Athithi, Veerayya brings Michael back to India. Following Michael's testimony, the court recognises Sagar's valour and grants him state honours, whilst also acquitting Veerayya of his charges. To fulfil Sagar's last wish of avenging the children's deaths, Veerayya severs Michael's head in the courtroom and is sentenced to prison.

Cast

Production 
In August 2021, it was announced that Chiranjeevi and K. S. Ravindra (also known as Bobby) would team up for a film tentatively titled Mega154 (intended to be Chiranjeevi's 154th film) under the production of Mythri Movie Makers. The film was formally launched in November 2021. In April 2022, Chiranjeevi unintentionally revealed the film is titled Waltair Veerayya. The title was officially confirmed in October 2022. Ravindra wrote the story and dialogues, which were scripted by Kona Venkat and K. Chakravarthy Reddy. Arthur A. Wilson was signed on as the cinematographer, marking his third collaboration with Bobby, after Power and Sardaar Gabbar Singh. Niranjan Devaramane was the film's editor. In March 2022, Ravi Teja joined the cast, reuniting with Chiranjeevi after 22 years since Annayya (2000). Teja reportedly plays his brother, a police officer disguised as a mafia don. Shruti Haasan was paired opposite Chiranjeevi, while Catherine Tresa is playing Teja's wife. Nawazuddin Siddiqui was approached to play the antagonist, but due to scheduling conflicts, was replaced by Bobby Simha. Malayalam actor Biju Menon was also offered a role in the film, however, was replaced by Prakash Raj. In the early November 2022, Urvashi Rautela was roped in for doing special appearance in a song. Principal photography commenced in December 2021 in Hyderabad. In April 2022, the second schedule commenced with Haasan joining the sets in Vishakapatnam. In July 2022, the third schedule commenced with Teja joining the sets. A schedule was also held in Malaysia.

Music 

The film score and soundtrack is composed by Devi Sri Prasad. The audio rights were acquired by Sony Music India. The first single titled "Boss Party" was released on 23 November 2022. The second single titled "Sridevi Chiranjeevi" was released on 19 December 2022. The third single titled "Veerayya Title Song" was released on 26 December 2022. The fourth single titled "Poonakaalu Loading" was released on 30 December 2022. The fifth single titled "Neekemo Andamekkuva" was released on 11 January 2023.

Release

Theatrical
Waltair Veerayya along with the Hindi dubbed version, was released in theaters on 13 January 2023 coinciding with the festival of Sankranti. The worldwide theatrical rights of the film were sold at a cost of ₹88 crore.

Home Media
The digital and satellite rights of the film were acquired by Netflix and Gemini TV, respectively. The film was premiered on Netflix from 27 February 2023.

Reception

Critical Response 
Waltair Veerayya received mixed reviews from critics.

Neeshita Nyayapati of The Times of India gave 3 out of 5 stars and wrote "Waltair Veerayya might not leave you feeling poonakalu as promised, but it’s decent enough, especially if you’re a Chiranjeevi fan or Ravi Teja’s for that matter. Just don't expect something out-of-the-box." Latha Srinivasan of India Today gave 3 out of 5 stars and wrote "Chiranjeevi's role in the film is reminiscent of his earlier films - massy, stylish, comical and full of action. Waltair Veerayya also stars Ravi Teja and Shruti Haasan, and is directed by Bobby Kolli. Chiru's fans are in for a treat." Haricharan Pudipeddi of Hindustan Times wrote "Bobby’s intention of delivering an out-and-out enjoyable commercial film with Waltair Veerayya works to a large extent, even when the predictability factor creeps in when you’re least expecting. The action sequences really serve as the film’s high moments and they deliver the thrills in a big way. These scenes do go overboard on multiple occasions but still work given the film’s massive scale."

Manoj Kumar R of The Indian Express rated the film 2 out of 5 stars and wrote "The filmmakers don't want the audience to respond to the character Waltair Veerayya, but they want us to venerate before the star playing Waltair Veerayya". Balakrishna Ganeshan of The News Minute gave the film a rating of 1.5 out of 5 and termed the film as "absolute mess", criticised the story and inconsistency tone of the film. Arvind V of Pinkvilla rated the film 2.5 out of 5 stars and praised the performances but criticised the writing and termed comedy as "insipid" & score as "bleak". Ram Venkat Srikar of Cinema Express rated the film 2.5 out of 5 stars and wrote "Films like Waltair Veerayya are reminders that masala cinema, when done neatly, will always be a treat". Soundarya Athimuthu of The Quint gave the film’s rating 3 out of 5 and wrote "Waltair Veerayya celebrates Chiranjeevi’s four-decade-long legacy with enjoyable characterization. It creates moments of intrigue and brilliant closures near the end".

Box office
The film grossed  worldwide on its opening day.

References

External links 

2023 films
Indian action films
2023 action films
Films scored by Devi Sri Prasad
Mythri Movie Makers films
Films set in Visakhapatnam
Films shot in Visakhapatnam
Films shot in France
2023 action comedy films
Indian action comedy films
Films set on beaches
Films set in Malaysia
Films set in Kuala Lumpur
Films shot in Hyderabad, India
Films shot in Malaysia
Films about brothers
Films about drugs
Films about organised crime in India